Mobarakabad (also Romanized as Mobārakābād; also known as Khīr and Mubārakābād) is a village in Khir Rural District, Runiz District, Estahban County, Fars Province, Iran. At the 2006 census, its population was 912, in 210 families.

References 

Populated places in Estahban County